Per Rasmussen (born 2 February 1959 in Svendborg) is a Danish rower.

References 
 
 

1959 births
Living people
Danish male rowers
Rowers at the 1980 Summer Olympics
Rowers at the 1984 Summer Olympics
Rowers at the 1988 Summer Olympics
Olympic bronze medalists for Denmark
Olympic rowers of Denmark
People from Svendborg
Olympic medalists in rowing
Medalists at the 1984 Summer Olympics
Sportspeople from the Region of Southern Denmark